Kolhapur State or Kolhapur Kingdom (1710–1949) was a Maratha princely State of India, under the Deccan Division of the Bombay Presidency, and later the Deccan States Agency. It was considered the most important of the Maratha principalities with the others being Baroda State, Gwalior State and Indore State. Its rulers, of the Bhonsle dynasty, were entitled to a 19-gun salute – thus Kolhapur was also known as a 19-gun state. The state flag was a swallow-tailed saffron pennant.

Kolhapur State, together with its jagirs or feudatory vassal estates (including Ichalkaranji), covered an area of 3,165 square miles (8,200 km2). According to the 1901 census, the state population was 910,011, of which 54,373 resided in Kolhapur Town. In 1901, the state enjoyed an estimated revenue of £300,000.

History 

The Maharajas of Kolhapur have a common ancestry with the Bhonsle dynasty of Satara, being direct descendants of the Maratha King Shivaji. The states of Satara and Kolhapur came into being in 1707, because of the succession dispute over the Maratha throne. Shahuji, the heir apparent to the Maratha kingdom, captured by the Mughals at the age of nine, remained their prisoner at the death of his father Sambhaji, the elder son of Shivaji the founder of the Maratha Empire,  in 1689. The Dowager Maharani Tarabai (widow of Rajaram I) proclaimed her son Shivaji II, as Chhatrapati under her regency. The Mughals released Shahu under certain conditions in 1707, and he returned to claim his inheritance. He defeated the regent at the Battle of Khed and established himself at Satara, forcing her to retire with her son to Kolhapur.  By 1710 two separate principalities had become an established fact. Shivaji II and Tarabai were soon deposed by Rajasbai, the other widow of Rajaram. She installed her own son, Sambhaji II as the new ruler of Kolhapur.In early years of his rule, Sambhaji  made alliance with the Nizam to wrest the Maratha kingdom from his cousin, Shahuji. The defeat of the Nizam by Bajirao I in the Battle of Palkhed in 1728  led to the former ending his support for Sambhaji. Sambhaji II signed the Treaty of Warna in 1731 with his cousin Shahuji to formalize the two separate seats of Bhonsle family. 

The British sent expeditions against Kolhapur in 1765 and 1792; Kolhapur entered into treaty relations with the British, after the collapse of the Maratha confederacy in 1812. In the early years of the 19th century the British invaded again, and appointed a political officer to temporarily manage the state.

A regent called Daji Krishna Pandit was installed by the British to govern the state in 1843 at a time when the natural heir to the throne was underage. He took direction from a political agent of the East India Company and among their actions were reforms to the tax of land. These reforms caused much resentment and, despite Kolhapur having refrained from involvement in the previous Anglo-Maratha Wars, a revolt against the British began in 1844. The rebellion began with soldiers locking themselves into hill-forts such as those as Panhala and Vishalgad, and then spread to Kolhapur itself. Both the regent and the political agent were captured by the militia forces led by Babaji Ahirekar.

The last ruler of Kolhapur was Maharaja Shahaji II. After Indian independence in 1947, Kolhapur acceded to the Dominion of India on 14 August 1947 and merged into Bombay State on 1 March 1949. In 1960 Bombay state was divided by languages into the states of Maharashtra and Gujarat.  The boundaries of former Kolhapur state correspond very closely with those of modern-day Kolhapur district in Maharashtra state.

Rulers of Kolhapur

Rajas 
1710 – 2 Aug 1714 Shivaji II (b.  1696 – d.   1726)
2 Aug 1714 – 18 Dec 1760 Sambhaji II (b.  1698 – d. 1760)
20 Dec 1760 – 17 Feb 1773  Rani Jiji Bai (f) – Regent(b. 1716 – d. 1773)
22 Sep 1762 – 24 Apr 1813  Shivaji III(b. 1756 – d. 1813)
24 Apr 1813 – 2 Jul 1821  Sambhaji III (b. 1801 – d. 1821)
2 Jul 1821 – 3 Jan 1822  Shivaji IV (b. 1816 – d. 1822)
2 Jul 1821 – 3 Jan 1822   Shahaji -Regent (b. 1802 – d. 1838)
3 Jan 1822 – 29 Nov 1838 Shahaji 
29 Nov 1838 – 4 Aug 1866  Shivaji V (b. 1830 – d. 1866)
29 Nov 1838 – 1845 Rani  Sai Bai  (f) -Regent (d. 1861)
4 Aug 1866 – 30 Nov 1870  Rajaram II Nagaji Rao (b. 1850 – d. 1870)
30 Nov 1870 – 12 Oct 1871  Rani Tara Bai (f) – Regent (b. 1855 – d. 1874)
12 Oct 1871 – 25 Dec 1883  Shivaji VI Chhatrapati Narayana Rao (b. 1863 – d. 1883)
25 Dec 1883 – 17 Mar 1884  Rani Anand Bai (f) – Regent
17 Mar 1884 – 1900  Shahu Chhatrapati Jashwant  (b. 1874 – see below)

Maharajas 
17 Mar 1884 – 20 Mar 1885  Jaisinhrao Ghatge  - Regent
1900 – 6 May 1922  Shahu Chhatrapati   (see above; d. 1922)
6 May 1922 – 26 Nov 1940  Rajaram III Chhatrapati (b. 1897 – d. 1940)
26 Nov 1940 – 18 Nov 1942  Tara Bai (f) -Regent (1st time) (b. 1904 – d. ....)
18 Nov 1942 – 28 Sep 1946  Shivaji VII Chhatrapati (b. 1941 – d. 1946)
22 Nov 1942 – 31 Mar 1947   Tara Bai (f) -Regent (2nd time) (s.a.)
31 Mar 1947 – 14 Aug 1947  Shahaji II Chhatrapati (b. 1910 – d. 1983)

Titular Maharajas
15 Aug 1947 – 9 May 1983 Shahaji II
1983 – present Shahu II

Family tree 

Babaaji Bhonsle
 Maloji Bhosale (1552–1606/20/22)
Shahaji Bhonsle (c.1594–1664)
 SHIVAJI The king of the Maratha Kingdom (c.1630–1680; Emperor: 1674–1680)
 Sambhaji, King of the Maratha kingdom (1657–1689; r. 1680–1689)
 Rajaram, King of the Maratha Kingdom (1670–1700; r. 1689–1700)
 I. Shivaji II, Raja of Kolhapur (1696–1726; Raja of Kolhapur: 1710–1714)
 II. Sambhaji II, Raja of Kolhapur (1698–1760; r. 1714–1760)
 Sharifjirao
 Trimbukjirao
 Venkatjirao
 Mankojirao
 Shahajirao
 III. Shivaji III, Raja of Kolhapur (1756–1813; r. 1762–1813)
 IV. Sambhaji III, Raja of Kolhapur (1801–1821; r. 1813–1821)
  V. Shivaji IV, Raja of Kolhapur (1816–1822; r. 1821–1822)
  VI. Shahaji I, Raja of Kolhapur (1802–1838; r. 1822–1838)
 VII. Shivaji V, Raja of Kolhapur KCSI (1830–1866; r. 1838–1866)
Shrimati Akhand Soubhagyavati Aubai Patankar m. (1845) Shrimant Sardar Ramchandrarao Patankar, Patil of Patan
  VIII. Rajaram II, Raja of Kolhapur (1850–1870; r. 1866–1870)
 Shrimati Akhand Soubhagyavati Balabai Maharaj Ghatge (d. 1867), m. (1848) Meherban Shrimant Chiranjiva Rajashri Narayanrao Ghatge, Sarjerao, Chief of Kagal Junior (c. 1833–1881)
 HH Meherban Shrimant Rajamanya Rajashri Jaisinhrao Ghatge, Sarjerao, Vazarat, Ma-ab, Chief of Kagal Senior (1857–1885) m. (2nd; 1878) Shrimant Akhand Soubhagyavati Radhabai Sahib Ghatge
  X. Shahu I, Maharaja of Kolhapur GCSI, GCIE, GCVO (1874–1922; r. 1884–1922; Raja of Kolhapur: 1884; Maharaja of Kolhapur: 1900)
HH Shrimant Akhand Soubhagyavati Maharani Radhabai Maharaj Puar, Maharani of Dewas Senior (1894–1973) m. (1908) HH Tukojirao III, Maharaja of Dewas Senior KCSI (1888–1937)
  XIII. Shahaji II, Maharaja of Dewas Senior, Maharaja of Kolhapur GCSI (1910–1983; Maharaja of Dewas Senior: 1937–1947; Maharaja of Kolhapur: 1947–1949; titular ruler: 1949–1971; family head: 1971–1983)
 Shrimant Akhand Soubhagyavati Maharajkumari Shaliniraje Sahib Maharaj Bhonsle (b. 1929) m. (1945) Shrijut Raje Rajaramsinhrao Laxmanrao Bhonsle (d. 1970)
 XIV. Shahu II, Maharaja of Kolhapur (b. 1948; family head: 1983–present)
  XI. Rajaram III, Maharaja of Kolhapur GCSI, GCIE (1897–1940; r. 1922–1940)
Sambhajirao
 Ramchandrarao
 Narayanjirao
 Dinkarrao (b. 1832)
  IX. Shivaji VI, Raja of Kolhapur KCSI (1863-1883; r. 1871-1883)
 Swarupjirao
 Mankojirao
 Yashwantrao (1832–1884)
 Appa Sahib
 Shivajirao
 Shankarrao (b. 1922)
  XII. Shivaji VII, Maharaja of Kolhapur (1941–1946; r. 1941–1946)

Feudatory Jagirs 
There were Eleven Feudatory Jagirdars of Kolhapur. They all paid Nazar on succession equal to a year's net income of their Jagirs and also an annual contribution towards the maintenance of military force. They are:

 Vishalgad
 Bavda
 Kagal (Senior)
 Kagal (Junior)
 Kapshi
 Torgal
 Ichalkaranji
 Himmat Bahadur
 SarLashkar Bahadur
 Shahi Sarnobat
 Raovishvasrao

See also 
 Maratha
 Maratha Empire
 List of Maratha dynasties and states
 List of princely states of British India (alphabetical)
 Maharajas of Kolhapur
 Panhala Fort

References

Further reading

External links 

 Mumbai and Princely States Heraldry

Princely states of Maharashtra
Kolhapur
History of Maharashtra
States and territories established in 1710
States and territories disestablished in 1949
Maratha Empire
1710 establishments in India
1949 disestablishments in India